Back to Basics is the twelfth studio album by Canadian heavy metal band Anvil, released in 2004.

Track listing

Personnel 
Source:
Anvil
Steve "Lips" Kudlow – vocals, lead guitar
Ivan Hurd – lead guitar
Glenn Five – bass
Robb Reiner – drums

Production
Pierre Rémillard – engineer, mixing, mastering
Torsten Hartmann – executive producer

References 

Anvil (band) albums
2004 albums
Massacre Records albums